KYKN (1430 AM) is a radio station licensed to serve Keizer, Oregon, United States. The station, established in 1951, is currently owned by the Willamette Broadcasting Company.

Programming
KYKN broadcasts a news/talk radio format to the Salem, Oregon, area that includes select programming from Premiere Radio Networks and Salem Radio Network (SRN).  KYKN programs include syndicated conservative-leaning talk shows hosted by Rush Limbaugh,  and Glenn Beck.

History

Launch as KGAE
This station began broadcasting in 1951 as KGAE with 1,000 watts of power, daytime-only, on a frequency of 1430 kHz. The station, licensed to serve the city of Salem, Oregon, was owned by a partnership known as Allen, Truhan, & Clark with partner W. Gordon serving as president and general manager.  This partnership would be soon dissolved leading to a now-oft cited court case that went all the way to the Oregon Supreme Court.  As a result, Allen took control of the stations in 1952 with the broadcast license transferred to a new company called KGAE, Inc. Allen remained president but Hal Davis took over the general manager duties.

Change to KGAY
In 1956, the station's call sign was changed to KGAY and the name of the license holding company was changed to KGAY, Inc., with W. Gordon Allen still in control.  That same year, KGAY was authorized to increase the power of its broadcast signal to 5,000 watts although it was still restricted to daytime operation.

After a succession of station managers through the 1950s, W. Gordon Allen resumed the general manager duties in 1959. By this time Allen, who owned a two-thirds interest in flagship KGAY, had also acquired a 70% interest in KGAL in Lebanon, Oregon, and a 48% interest in KMAT in Winnsboro, Louisiana, as part of his W. Gordon Allen Stations group.

After nearly a decade of ownership, W. Gordon Allen and KGAY, Inc., agreed to sell the station to a company known as Radio Wonderful Willametteland, Inc.  The deal was consummated on July 1, 1961.  Glen M. Stadler took the title of general manager while Robert Bruce was named station manager.  Stadler owned a one-third interest in KGAY, as did his partners Harry Rubenstein and Alex Dreier.  The three men also owned equal shares in KGAL in Lebanon, Oregon.  Stadler was the sole owner of KEED and KEED-FM in the Springfield-Eugene, Oregon, area.  By the end of the 1960s, KGAY, Inc., was wholly owned by Glen Stadler and his wife, Helen N. Stadler, who also served as vice president of the company.

In 1968, the Stadlers announced their intention to retire from radio to "enter the academic field" and so they put KGAY up for sale.  They contracted to sell the station to Capitol Equities, Inc., for a reported cash price of $175,000. The deal closed on August 15, 1968, and Donald H. Cushing took over as president of the company with Leslie J. Manning as general manager.  By 1970, the station was airing a pure country & western music format. They would maintain this focus on country music throughout the 1970s.

KYKN today
In April 1985, the station applied to the Federal Communications Commission to make major changes to their licensed operation: add nighttime service with 5,000 watts of power, add a directional antenna array to the new nighttime signal, and change the legal community of license from Salem to nearby Keizer, Oregon. The FCC granted a new construction permit to authorize these changes on September 18, 1985, and, after one extension, the station received its license to cover these changes on January 16, 1987.

While these changes were underway, the station was assigned the KYKN call sign by the FCC on May 15, 1986. The station slogan was "Kickin County".  The station remained a country music format until it switched to news/talk in the spring of 1991..   DJ Tim O'Brian(Hay) signed off the country music format with "The Last Cowboy Song" by Ed Bruce on Sunday, May 5, 1991 at midnight.    The Station signed on at 5:00 am Monday as News/Talk broadcasting CNN Headline news.

In April 1991, Capitol Equities Corporation reached an agreement to sell this station to Willamette Broadcasting Company, Inc.  The deal was approved by the FCC on August 1, 1991, and the transaction was consummated on September 18, 1991.

References

External links

YKN
News and talk radio stations in the United States
Radio stations established in 1951
Keizer, Oregon
1951 establishments in Oregon